The SouthWest Service (SWS) is a Metra commuter rail line, running southwest from Union Station in downtown Chicago, Illinois, to Manhattan, Illinois. Metra does not refer to its lines by color, but the timetable accents for the SouthWest Service line are "Banner Blue," for the Wabash Railroad's Banner Blue passenger train. The trackage is owned by Metra north of a junction with the Belt Railway of Chicago at Loomis Boulevard, and is leased from Norfolk Southern Railway south of the junction (NS has trackage rights over Metra's portion).

History
The line south of the curve at the east end of the section aligned with 75th Street was built by the Wabash, St. Louis and Pacific Railway, which opened in 1880 to Chicago. That curve was a junction with the Chicago and Western Indiana Railroad, of which the Wabash owned one-fifth, and used to reach Dearborn Station in downtown Chicago. Commuter service from Chicago began as early as 1893, with trains running as far south as Orland Park, and by 1909, the service had been extended with several trains operating as far south as Manhattan. The level of service deteriorated in the 1930s, with commuter operations effectively reduced to one train in each direction making local stops from Chicago to Decatur. By 1964, the once daily Chicago–Decatur trains were cut back to Orland Park.

After several reorganizations the Wabash Railroad was leased by the Norfolk and Western Railway on October 16, 1964. The single round trip continued under the new ownership, who named the train the Orland Park Cannonball. On May 1, 1971, Amtrak assumed control of most intercity passenger trains in the United States. On this date all intercity services operating into and out of Chicago were either routed into Union Station or discontinued, leaving the single Orland Park Cannonball as the only train to still use Dearborn Station. Dearborn Station closed, but the commuter train continued to use a small platform and track on the property until 1976 when it relocated to Union Station via a new connection at Alton Junction.

The Regional Transportation Authority began to subsidize the service in 1978. N&W merged with Southern Railway to form the Norfolk Southern Railway in 1982, and for the next decade the line was known as the Norfolk Southern Line (NS). The RTA closed the Western Avenue station on May 15, 1984, as part of a cost reduction plan which saw the closure of twelve other lightly used stations and the removal of ticket agents from an additional seventeen stations across the system. On June 1, 1993 Metra took over operations and renamed it the SouthWest Service.

The rail line expansion project, which includes  of new track and at least two additional train stations, was completed (except for the Laraway Road station) in January 2006. The number of trains per day was doubled from 16 to 30, 15 in each direction. For years, Pace operated Route 835, whose bus service enhanced the limited train service in the SouthWest Service corridor. With the rail service expansion, ridership on route 835 became so poor that Pace eliminated it on August 17, 2007.

Metra started Saturday service on March 21, 2009, with six trains between Union Station and Manhattan.

SouthWest Service trains will shift from Union Station to LaSalle Street Station with the reconfiguration of the 75th Street Corridor under the auspices of the Chicago Region Environmental and Transportation Efficiency Program (CREATE). This will happen no earlier than 2025 when construction is scheduled for completion. Additional mainline trackage will also be built between LaSalle St Station and 74th to handle the increase in traffic. LaSalle Street station will also be expanded. This would relieve congestion at Union Station and improve reliability for the SouthWest Service, as well as allowing more trains to run in each direction.

Service frequency
As of January 16, 2023, Metra operates 30 trains (15 in each direction) on the SouthWest Service Line on weekdays. Three of the trains that travel beyond 179th Street serve  and Manhattan as "flag to discharge" stops.

Since March 2020 and as of January 2023, Saturday service on the SouthWest Service is currently suspended. There is also no service on Sundays or holidays.

The Laraway Road and Manhattan stations see a combined ridership of under 60 people daily, making them two of the least-used stations on Metra's system.

Ridership
Since 2014 annual ridership has declined from 2,659,040 to 2,356,767, an overall decline of 11.4%. Due to the COVID-19 pandemic, ridership dropped to 574,815 passengers in 2020.

Stations

References

External links

Metra SouthWest Service Information
Metra SouthWest Service Expansion Project

Metra lines
Wabash Railroad
Norfolk and Western Railway
Norfolk Southern Railway